The name Hortense has been used for four tropical cyclones worldwide: three in the Atlantic Ocean and one in the South-West Indian region.
 Hurricane Hortense (1984) - meandered over Bermuda as a tropical storm, causing no reported damage.
 Tropical Storm Hortense (1990) - disrupted by interaction with Hurricane Gustav.
 Hurricane Hortense (1996) - damaging and deadly cyclone that passed over Guadeloupe and Puerto Rico, and grazed the eastern Dominican Republic and the Turks and Caicos Islands.

The name Hortense was retired in the Atlantic Basin after the 1996 season, and was replaced by Hanna in the 2002 season.

In the South-West Indian Ocean:
 Tropical Storm Hortense (1973) – a powerful tropical storm passed south of Reunion, bringing rain to the island after hitting Madagascar.

Atlantic hurricane set index articles